The FIVB Volleyball Men's Intercontinental Olympic Qualification Tournaments is a volleyball qualification tournament for the Olympic Games. contested by the senior men's national teams of the members of the  (FIVB), the sport's global governing body.

The creation of the tournament was announced in October 2018 (alongside with the announcement of the 2020 Olympic Qualification System)

A corresponding tournament for women's national teams is the FIVB Women's Volleyball Intercontinental Olympic Qualification Tournaments.

Appearance

Legend
 – Champions
2nd – Runners-up
3rd – Third place
4th – Fourth place
 – Did not enter / Did not qualify
 – Hosts

Results summary

See also
FIVB Volleyball Women's Intercontinental Olympic Qualification Tournaments
FIVB Men's Volleyball World Olympic Qualification Tournament

References

External links
Fédération Internationale de Volleyball – official website

 
Recurring sporting events established in 2019
International men's volleyball competitions
Quadrennial sporting events